Laurence William Neal (born 18 July 1947) is a former Australian politician. Born at Wangaratta, Victoria, he was educated at La Trobe University in Melbourne before becoming a teacher and private tutor. On 11 March 1980, he was appointed to the Australian Senate as a National Country Senator for Victoria, filling the vacancy caused by the resignation of Senator James Webster. He contested the election later that year but was defeated, his term expiring in 1981.

References

National Party of Australia members of the Parliament of Australia
Members of the Australian Senate for Victoria
Members of the Australian Senate
1947 births
Living people
People from Wangaratta
La Trobe University alumni
20th-century Australian politicians